Samuel Brejar born Gilberto Yabar-Valdez (Lima, Peru, July 28, 1941 – 2006) was a French poet born in Peru.

Biography
Samuel Brejar is the pseudonym of Gilberto Yabar-Valdez. Samuel Brejar was born in Lima, Peru, on July 28, 1941. He was the grandson of Orihuelo-Yabar, a well-known and wealthy landowner in the Andes of southern Peru. His origins from his father side were a mix of Spanish and Italian ancestry. From his mother side, Samuel Brejar was part Quechua (i.e., Native Americans of Peru). 
Samuel Brejar studied with the Jesuits in Lima. When his father suddenly died in a car accident while he was 16 years old, he had to start working while pursuing his studies in the evening. He then became aware of the harsh reality of the working class in Peru. This period in his life allows us to understand its communist political commitments. In addition, deeply anti-war, he changed his birth certificate in order to avoid military service. He soon suffered the consequences of his political commitments, as he was imprisoned and tortured. On several occasions, he was arrested in the street of Lima and sent straight away into exile in Chile or Argentina.

In the early 70s, Samuel Brejar moved to Mexico where he met Noëlle Vuillermoz, a French student in ethno-history. They fell in love and he settled in France. They lived a few years in Paris and moved to Brittany. Samuel Brejar was the friend of the Mexican poet, Fracisco Azuela. Samuel Brejar died in October 2006.

Poetic and Theatrical Work
The purpose of Samuel Brejar's life has always been writing poetry and theatre. In Peru and Mexico, Samuel Brejar had the opportunity to publish his first poems (e.g., "Todas las mordazas", 1965, "Hallazgos del comportamiento raro", 1967, "Legajos del archivista", 1969, "Los cantos destruidos", 1970, "Cuentero del duende", 1971, "Palabras matadas", 1972). However, it is France that Samuel Brejar wrote most of his poetic and theatrical works.

Poetry and Theatre
Poetry: "Writings of the Andean", 1978, "The Exiliades", 1981, "Slang of the Horde", 1983, "Ariel archives", 1985, "Book of words", 1992, "Qori Kontur", 2001.

Theatre: "Zeal for the summer", 1983, "The crocodiles massager" 1984, "the Kings empty-handed", 1985, "The night", 1989, "silence", "A fall afternoon Songe", these last two pieces being unpublished.

Journals
From June 1993 to December 2006, Samuel Brejar published “Rimbaud Revue” (i.e., semi-annual journal of international literature) in collaboration with his wife Noëlle Yabar-Valdez. Rimbaud Revue focused on new poets and writers, Spanish or French work from Europe or Latin America with a large selection of poems, essays, studies, critics, chronics, stories, interviews, translations, reproductions of contemporary art, presentation of books and other revues.

About Samuel Brejar’s Poetic and Theatrical Work
- Philippe Saubadine: "It’s a true native American requiem that Samuel Brejar creates with his lamentations and his grief of Ota¬ranta, protective soul of the clans, whose saga searches in the heart of memory to extricate sacrifices and massacres together in finding powerless and premonitory vocation." (1)

- Jean Breton: "Qori Kontur is a complex creation that enlightens us on what must be the experience of exile." (2)

- Roland Counard: "We celebrate the excellence of Rimbaud Revue." (3)

- Karel Hadek: "We much regret the decision of Samuel Brejar to end the publication of Rimbaud Revue which was undoubtedly a revue of majeure importance." (4)

References

- Philippe Saubadine, in "News of the Adour", n ° 41, 2001, pp. 66–68, about "Qori Kontur", Samuel Brejar, ed. John Donne & Cie. (1)

- Jean Breton, in "Men without shoulder", new series, 2nd half of 2001, p133, about "Qori Kontur", Samuel Brejar, ed. John Donne & Cie. (2)

- Roland Counard, in "Tree with words", January–February 1997, n ° 93, p. 99, bi-monthly Belgian francophone poetry, about Samuel Brejar, founder and Director of the journal of literature and poetry "Rimbaud Review". (3)

- Karel Hadek, in "Men without shoulder ", new series, 2nd half of 2006, p. 153 about Samuel Brejar, founder and Director of the journal of literature and poetry "Rimbaud review". (4)

External links
 Samuel Brejar (French)

1941 births
2006 deaths
People from Lima
French male poets
20th-century French poets
20th-century French male writers